Fred Schuster is a New Zealand rugby league player who represented New Zealand in 1970.

Playing career
In 1970 Schuster played in two games against the touring Great Britain Lions. He was part of the Auckland side that lost to the Lions 8–23 and then played for New Zealand in their 9–23 loss at Rugby League Park.

In 1971, Schuster played for Auckland in their 15–14 win over Australia.

References

New Zealand rugby league players
New Zealand national rugby league team players
Auckland rugby league team players
Rugby league five-eighths